Prodoxus sonorensis is a moth of the family Prodoxidae. It is found in south-eastern Arizona, United States, and south into northern Sonora, Mexico.

The wingspan is 8.9-12.8 mm for males and 10.9-15.6 mm for females. The forewings are white with a dark brown pattern. The hindwings are grayish brown. Adults are on wing from late June to mid August.

The larvae feed on Yucca schottii. Larval cohorts emerge as adults over at least six years even when artificial winter and water is provided.

Etymology
The name refers to the Sonoran Desert, where all known populations are found.

References

Moths described in 2005
Prodoxidae